Jean-Luc Schaffhauser (born 17 December 1955) was a National Front Member of the European Parliament from 2014 to 2019 representing Île-de-France.

References

1955 births
Living people
MEPs for Île-de-France 2014–2019
National Rally (France) MEPs
People from Cambrai